Pik Skalisty is the highest peak in the Kara-Bel Range, Pamir-Alay.

It is located in the Batken Region of Kyrgyzstan, 7 km from the border of Tajikistan.

See also
List of Ultras of Central Asia
Pamir Mountains

References

Mountains of Kyrgyzstan
Five-thousanders